Fire høytider is a Norwegian television mini-series directed by Leidulv Risan that originally aired on Norwegian TV channel NRK1 in 2000.

The series consisted of five episodes where each episode dealt with an ethical dilemma.

Selected cast

Erik Ulfsby
Ane Dahl Torp
Linn Skåber
Jan Ø. Wiig
Petronella Barker
Kim Haugen
Mads Ousdal
Susan Badrkhan
Alf Nordvang
Ghita Nørby
Marianne Krogh
Paul Ottar Haga

External links 
 

2000 Norwegian television series debuts